The  International Western Music Association was incorporated in 1989 to promote and preserve  western music in its traditional, historical, and contemporary forms.

The IWMA stages the International Western Music Festival every November during which it announces winners in categories including Traditional Western Duo/Group of the Year, Traditional Western Album of the Year, Song of the Year, Songwriter of the Year, Male and Female Performers of the Year, Entertainer of the Year, etc.

It also publishes The Western Way, a magazine dedicated to the promotion of western music, and sponsors the Western Music Hall of Fame.

See also
Academy of Western Artists, based in Gene Autry, Oklahoma

References

External links
Western Music Association

Music organizations based in the United States
Culture of the Western United States
Coppell, Texas
Organizations based in Texas